The Hunter 36 is an American sailboat that was designed by John Cherubini as a cruising sailboat and first built in 1980.

The design can be confused with the 1990 Hunter 36 Vision, 2008 Hunter 36-2 (sold as the Hunter 36) and the 2001 Hunter 36 Legend, all sailboats with similar names by the same builder.

Production
The design was built by Hunter Marine in the United States between 1980-1983, but it is now out of production.

Design
The Hunter 36 is a recreational keelboat, built predominantly of fiberglass, with wood trim. It has a masthead sloop rig, a raked stem, a raised reverse transom, an internally-mounted spade-type rudder controlled by a wheel and a fixed fin keel. It displaces  and carries  of ballast.

The boat is fitted with an inboard diesel engine.

The design features two private cabins, one forward and one aft, a head with a shower, a U-shaped dining area which converts to a berth, a galley with an oven and a two-burner stove, plus an icebox that can be accessed from the cockpit while under way. The jib is roller furling and dual two-speed, self-tailing winches are provided as standard equipment.

See also
List of sailing boat types

Related development
Hunter 34

Similar sailboats
Bayfield 36
Beneteau 361
C&C 36-1
C&C 36R
C&C 110
Catalina 36
Columbia 36
Coronado 35
CS 36
Ericson 36
Frigate 36
Hinterhoeller F3
Hunter 36-2
Hunter 36 Legend
Hunter 36 Vision
Invader 36
Islander 36
Nonsuch 36
Portman 36
S2 11.0
Seidelmann 37
Vancouver 36 (Harris)
Watkins 36
Watkins 36C

References

External links
Official brochure

Keelboats
1980s sailboat type designs
Sailing yachts
Sailboat type designs by John Cherubini
Sailboat types built by Hunter Marine